The United States Submarine Veterans, Inc. (USSVI) is an organization created by a group from the United States Submarine Veterans of World War II. They shared a belief in the need for an organization open to all United States Navy submariners, from the very beginning of the Submarine Service to the present and into the future - not limited to just those who served so ably in World War II.  They wanted to ensure their shipmates who were killed in action on submarines would never be forgotten.

Purpose
Nearly 4,000 submariners have sacrificed their lives on the altar of American freedoms.  It is the primary mission of USSVI to perpetuate their memory through memorials and "tolling the boats" memorial services.  Per the USSVI Constitution Article III the Purpose/Creed consists of three sections:

Creed
Section 1:  To perpetuate the memory of our shipmates who gave their lives in the 
pursuit of their duties while serving their country. That their 
dedication, deeds, and supreme sacrifice be a constant source of 
motivation toward greater accomplishments. Pledge loyalty and patriotism 
to the United States of America and its Constitution.

Camaraderie
Section 2:  In addition to perpetuating the memory of departed shipmates, USSVI provides a way for all Submariners to gather for mutual benefit and enjoyment.  The common heritage as Submariners is strengthened by camaraderie.  USSVI supports a strong United States Submarine Force.

Perpetual remembrance
Section 3:  The organization engages in various projects and deeds that bring about the perpetual remembrance of those shipmates who have given the supreme sacrifice.  USSVI also endeavors to educate all third parties it comes in contact with about the services United States submariners performed and how the sacrifices of lost shipmates made possible the freedom and lifestyle Americans enjoy today.

History

United States Submarine Veterans of World War II

Prior to the founding of the United States Submarine Veterans, Inc. (USSVI), there existed another U.S. submarine veterans association, the United States Submarine Veterans of World War II which still exists today.  Founded in July 1955, membership in this organization is limited to submarine crews and relief crews who were on active duty from December 1, 1941, through September 1, 1945.  As this organization grew, so did the development and deployment of American submarines across the globe, and it became apparent to many that there was a need and a strong desire for a new organization to include submariners of all eras.

Formation of USSVI

Fueled by a desire to form a new association, and inspired by the tragic loss of the USS Thresher (SSN-593) on April 10, 1963, a meeting was set for October 12, 1963.  Led by Dominic ‘Joe’ Negri and others, the Charter Meeting of USSVI was held in Orange, New Jersey, with 16 representatives present.  The Creed and National Bylaws were established at this inaugural meeting.  Officers were appointed to serve in an acting capacity until regular elections could be held in the summer of 1964.  Robert Link was appointed president; Ken Walkington, vice-president; Joe Burges, Secretary; and Mike Drucker, Treasurer.

Incorporation
On May 24, 1964, shipmates Joe Negri, Ken Walkington, and Joe Marion met with New London, Connecticut attorney, L. Patrick Gray, Captain, U.S. Navy (Retired) (who later became the Director of the Federal Bureau of Investigation), to legally constitute USSVI as a legal, non-profit organization in the State of Connecticut, with a license to operate and conduct business in all 50 states.  The organization was officially incorporated and chartered in New London, Connecticut.  The signatories were Joe Negri, Ken Walkington, and Joe Marion.  Additional USSVI Plank Owners included Warren ‘Ed’ Gannon, Angelo La Pelosa, Robert Link, Tom Rowan, and Hugh Trimble.  They selected former United States Submarine Veterans of World War II National Commander Bob Link as their first acting National Commander.  Joe Negri was elected the first Connecticut State Commander and Dick Higham was elected the first Base Commander of Connecticut Base #1, which later became Groton Base.  This fledgling organization would soon grew to several hundred shipmates scattered throughout Connecticut, New York, Pennsylvania, Massachusetts, and New Jersey.

First National Convention
The first National Convention was held in Atlantic City, New Jersey on June 18–20, 1964.  Acting President, Robert Link of Absecon, New Jersey was host to the delegates at the Traymore Hotel.  Nine eastern states were represented by Ed Sena from New York, Dick Higham from Connecticut, Elmo Wittig from New Jersey, Thomas ‘Doc’ Smith from New Jersey, Herman Schmidt from New Jersey, Art Clarke from Pennsylvania, Joe Negri and Ken Walkington of Connecticut.  Commander Charles Carlisle, Commanding officer of USS Tecumseh (SSBN-628), served as guest speaker for the first annual convention.  Vice Admiral Charles A. Lockwood was also a guest in attendance.

A new slate of National Officers was elected at the first Convention.  Joe Negri was elected National Commander; KenWalkington, Vice Commander; Joe Burges, Secretary; and Mike Drucker, Treasurer.  National Directors were JoeWebb, Dick Higham, and Joe Marion.

National Headquarters
The Groton Base started operating immediately and held meetings at the K of C in Groton.  The attendance at these meetings was between 60 and 75 members.  Joe Negri was elected the first state commander and Dick Higman was the first Base Commander.  About a year later it was determined that they needed their own building and it was voted to sell raffle tickets (1000 tickets at $10 each) for a gold Cadillac to raise the money for the down payment on the present home at 40 School Street in Groton, Connecticut.

The base building on School Street became a reality in 1966.  Due to the fact that the Groton USSVI/Base was incorporated within the State of Connecticut and they had their own building, it was voted that Groton become the National Headquarters of USSVI.

Organization

National officers

Nationally elected officers of USSVI are:

 National Commander (NC)
 National Senior Vice-Commander (NSVC)
 National Junior Vice-Commander (NJVC)
 National Secretary (NS)
 National Treasurer (NT)

The prerequisite for National Office is that a nominee must be a Regular Member in good standing a minimum of thirty consecutive months.  The term of office for all national officers is two years or until a successor is elected.  No individual can serve more than two consecutive terms as National Commander.  Other than the position of National Commander, there are no restrictions on the number of terms an individual may be elected to any office.

Board of Directors
The Board of Directors has the control and general management of the affairs and business of the organization.  It is composed of the national elected officers, the Regional Directors, the District Commander Of The Year, the District Commanders, the immediate Past National Commander, the President of the Ladies Auxiliary and the Commander of the Holland Club.

Regional Directors
Regional Directors (SE, NE, Central, and Western) are directly responsible to the National Commander for the conduct of organizational business within their region.  They serve as members of the Board of Directors, members of the Scholarship Committee, and perform other such duties as required by the National Constitution and USSVI Bylaws.

District Commanders
District Commanders serve as non-voting members of the board of directors. They assist the Base Commanders within their respective districts in the performance of their duties, to include providing assistance as required to ensure the proper operation of base meetings and events, recruiting and retention.  They appoint all district committees, committee chairmen and appointed officers as required to conduct district business.  They also approve the base constitution and bylaws, ensuring compliance with national and state laws regulating the operation of the organization within his district (i.e. chartering, maintaining non-profit status).

Base Commanders
Base Commanders are responsible for the day-to-day operation of their specific base in accordance with their base bylaws.

Structure
USSVI is organized by regions, districts, and bases throughout the United States.

National Office
The National Office is located in Silverdale, Washington and manages membership and administrative services.

National Library
The National Library is located in North Little Rock, Arkansas at the Arkansas Inland Maritime Museum.  The library has a complete set of the following magazines:

 Polaris magazine (which is currently being scanned for archive)
 United States Submarine Veterans of World War II ladies' magazine
 American Submariner magazine (of which about 50% has been scanned for archive)

Membership
USSVI currently has over 12,000 US Submarine qualified members.

Regular
USSVI Regular membership is restricted to current and former U.S. military personnel, who have been designated "Qualified in Submarines" by authorized U.S. Navy Command Authority, or are regular members of the U.S. Submarine Veterans of World War II.

All are invited to join their shipmates in "Subvets".  More information can be found at the USSVI website.

Life
Regular and Associate Members may become Life Members by paying the National Life Membership fee established in the organization's bylaws.  National Life Members will pay no further national dues, but may be required to pay base dues as per base bylaws.  A base may offer a member, who is a National Life Member, Base Life Membership, not to exceed the cost of National Life membership.

National Life Membership was inaugurated in 1984 at the National Business Meeting in Groton, Connecticut.

Base Life Membership, in 1985, was voted-in at the Boston Base, available with National Life Membership as a prerequisite.

Primary and dual
When an applicant selects a base to join, that base becomes his "primary" base.  This is done for National voting reasons.  National election ballots are distributed according to a member's primary base.  A "dual" member is someone who has also joined other bases as their interests dictate.  The member may also vote in local base elections through his "dual" base(s), but national election voting is always only done through the member's primary base.

Associate
An Associate Member is a person who is not eligible for regular membership but is closely associated with a Regular Member.

Each Associate Member must be sponsored by a Regular Member in good standing and are eligible for Life Membership.  Associate Membership is reserved for persons not otherwise eligible for regular membership, but who are related to the Submarine Service by their deeds or actions.  All Associate Members must be at least sixteen (16) years of age.  This does not preclude any relative of a regular member in good standing from applying for Associate Membership.

Auxiliary
An 
Auxiliary to the United States Submarine Veterans Inc. has been established and is known as "The Auxiliary of the United States Submarine Veterans, Incorporated".  Any base may adopt an Auxiliary at their own discretion; however, the adopted USSVI Bylaws must be approved by the District Commander prior to implementation.  Membership in the Auxiliary is limited to USSVI or SVWWII member's wives, widows, siblings, parents and children not less than 16 years of age.

Rickover Club 
Any Regular Member who has been designated "Qualified in Submarines" for twenty five (25) Years or more and who is a member in good standing is eligible to become a member of the "Rickover Club" within the organization.

The Rickover Club was named after Hyman G. Rickover, an admiral in the U.S. Navy known as the "Father of the Nuclear Navy," who directed the original development of naval nuclear propulsion and controlled its operations for three decades as director of the U.S. Naval Reactors office.  The Los Angeles-class submarine USS Hyman G. Rickover (SSN-709) was named for him.commissioned on July 21, 1984, and deactivated on December 14, 2006. On July 31, 2021 the Navy christened a Virginia-class submarine named USS Hyman G. Rickover (SSN-795) in his honor.

Holland Club 
Any Regular Member who has been designated "Qualified in Submarines" for fifty (50) years or more and who is a member in good standing is eligible to become a member of the "Holland Club" within the organization.

The Holland Club was named after John Philip Holland, an engineer who developed the first submarine to be formally commissioned by the U.S. Navy.

Member-at-Large
The base or National Membership Chairman may place any member, who chooses, or is assigned to, a base, and who is a National Life Member or whose National annual dues are current, but whose base dues are in arrears, in a category of Member-at-Large.  Members-at-Large whose national annual dues are current or who are National Life Members will retain national benefits (i.e. receipt of national magazine and voting on national issues).  A Member-at-Large may affiliate with a base at any time by remitting base dues.  A Regular base member may transfer to Member-at-Large Status at any time by making a request to his affiliated base or to the National Membership Chair.

Committees
 Membership
 Scholarship
 Ways and Means
 Long Range Planning
 Memorials and Ceremonies
 Public Relations and Publicity
 Nominations
 National Archives
 New Base Development
 Constitution and Bylaws
 Veterans Affairs
 Awards
 National Convention
 Base Commanders Group
 Technology
 Audit

Charitable funds
The USSVI Charitable Foundation (USSVCF) is administered by a board of directors made up of non-paid elected and appointed members.  Expenses incurred by the Charitable Foundation are minimal and consist of expenses such as postage, certificates, website fees, stationery supplies, and informative brochures.

The foundation was approved for tax exemption under Section 501(c)(3) of the Internal Revenue Code on December 5, 2000.  To facilitate the many activities that may arise, the foundation is split into various dedicated funds.

 Brotherhood Funds
 Building Fund
 General Fund
 Memorial Funds
 Scholarship Funds
 Submarine Library Fund
 Submarine Museum Fund

American Submariner magazine
American Submariner is the quarterly magazine published by USSVI and is a major benefit that all USSVI members receive.  The purpose of the magazine is to keep the membership informed of organizational events the latest developments in the U.S. Navy's Submarine force.  It also honors tradition, heritage, and service of all submariners, who proudly earned the designation "Qualified in Submarines", by regularly featuring articles about submarines, their crews, and missions conducted during the eras of World War II, Korean War, Vietnam War, and the First Gulf War.

In May 1969, the magazine Submarine National Review came into existence to better establish communications and rapport within the submarine community, with Ken Walkington and Tom Rowan serving as co-editors.  It was renamed American Submariner in December 1977.  It reverted to Submarine National Review in January 1979 but in July 1991 it was renamed yet again to American Submariner It retained the subtitle of National Submarine Review until 2000.

Annual National Conventions
 2019: Austin, Texas
2018: Cruise, Ft. Lauderdale, Florida
2017: Orlando, Florida
 2016: Reno, Nevada
 2015: Pittsburgh, Pennsylvania
 2014: Burlingame, California
 2013: Rochester, Minnesota
 2012: Norfolk, Virginia
 2011: Springfield, Missouri
 2010: Covington, Kentucky, 30 August through 6 September 2010
 2009: San Diego, California
 2008: Fort Worth, Texas
 2007: Seattle, Washington
 2006: Little Rock, Arkansas
 2005: Kansas City, Missouri
 2004: Saratoga Springs, New York
 2003: Reno, Nevada
 2002: Duluth, Minnesota
 2001: Peoria, Illinois
 2000: Atlantic City, New Jersey
 1999: Reno, Nevada
 1998: Hagerstown, Maryland
 1997: Mobile, Alabama
 1996: Portland, Oregon
 1995: Manitowoc, Wisconsin
 1994: Portsmouth, New Hampshire
 1993: Vallejo, California
 1992: Norfolk, Virginia
 1991: Honolulu, Hawaii
 1990: Montreal, Canada
 1989: San Diego, California
 1988: Rochelle Park, New Jersey
 1987: Albuquerque, New Mexico
 1986: Boston, Massachusetts
 1985: Bremerton, Washington
 1984: Groton, Connecticut
 1983: San Diego, California
 1982: Montreal, Canada
 1981: Portsmouth, New Hampshire
 1980: Groton, Connecticut
 1979: Elmont, New York
 1978: Honolulu, Hawaii
 1977: San Diego, California
 1976: Albuquerque, New Mexico
 1975: Atlantic City, New Jersey
 1974: Hampton, Virginia
 1973: Highland, New York
 1972: San Juan, Puerto Rico
 1971: Portsmouth, New Hampshire
 1970: Chicago, Illinois
 1969: Boston, Massachusetts
 1968: Cherry Hill, North Carolina
 1967: Hempstead, New York
 1966: Groton, Connecticut
 1965: New London, Connecticut
 1964: Atlantic City, New Jersey

Submarine articles
 Submarine warfare
 Ballistic missile submarine
 Deep Submergence Vehicle
 Submarines in the United States Navy
 List of submarine actions
 List of submarine museums
 List of sunken nuclear submarines
 List of lost United States submarines

References

 USSVI history
 USSVI bases
 USSVI Creed
 USSVI membership
 USSVI American Submariner magazine (USSVI members only)

External links
 United States Submarine Veterans, Inc.
 USSVI National Office
 On Eternal Patrol
 NavSource Naval History: Submarine Photo Archive

American veterans' organizations